Hardwicke High School and College is an educational institute in Mysore. The school offers primary, higher primary, high school, and pre-university level education.

History
Formerly known as Wesleyan High School and Methodist Mission High School, Hardwicke High School and Pre-University College was founded in 1840 during the rule of Maharaja Krishnaraja Wadiyar III.

Subsidiaries
 Hardwicke Church, Vani Vilas Road, Mysore

Alumni
 Kuvempu, Kannada Poet

See also
List of Heritage Buildings in Mysore

References

1840 establishments in India
Educational institutions established in 1840
High schools and secondary schools in Mysore